I Pagliacci is a 1923 British silent historical drama film directed by G. B. Samuelson and S. W. Smith and starring Adelqui Migliar, Lillian Hall-Davis and Campbell Gullan. The film was shot at Isleworth Studios. It is based on the 1892 opera Pagliacci by Ruggero Leoncavallo.

Cast
 Adelqui Migliar as Canio, the Clown  
 Lillian Hall-Davis as Nedda  
 Campbell Gullan as Tonio  
 Frank Dane as Silvio 
 Alexander Butler 
 G. Longoborde

References

Bibliography
 Goble, Alan. The Complete Index to Literary Sources in Film. Walter de Gruyter, 1999.

External links
 

1923 films
1920s historical drama films
1920s color films
British historical drama films
British silent feature films
Films directed by G. B. Samuelson
Films shot at Isleworth Studios
Films based on operas
Films set in Italy
Films set in the 19th century
British black-and-white films
1923 drama films
1920s English-language films
1920s British films
Silent historical drama films